This is a list of the first women lawyer(s) and judge(s) in Missouri. It includes the year in which the women were admitted to practice law (in parentheses). Also included are women who achieved other distinctions such becoming the first in their state to graduate from law school or become a political figure.

Firsts in Missouri's history

Law School 

 First female law graduate: Phoebe Couzins in 1871

Lawyers 

First female: Lemma Barkaloo (1870)  
 First female (practice law in the first congressional district of Maryland): Lois Buhl (1904)
First African American female: Dorothy L. Freeman (1942)  
First (African American) female (U.S. Commission on Civil Rights): Frankie Muse Freeman (1937) in 1964  
First African American female to practice before the Supreme Court of the United States: Leona P. Thurman (1949)

State judges 

First female (non-attorney judge): Frances Hopkins in 1915  
First female elected: Margaret Young (1931) in 1954 
First female appointed: Marybelle Mueller (1950) in 1955  
First female (under the Missouri Nonpartisan Court Plan): Anna Forder (1974) in 1979  
First female elected (circuit court): Ellen Roper (1973) in 1982  
 First African American female: Evelyn Marie Baker in 1983  
 First female (Supreme Court of Missouri): Ann K. Covington (1977) in 1988 
 First Hispanic American female (circuit court): Justine Del Muro in 1993  
 First female (Supreme Court of Missouri; Chief Justice): Ann K. Covington (1977) from 1993-1995  
 First African American female (Missouri Court of Appeals): Lisa White Hardwick (1985) in 2001 
 First Asian American (female): Judy Preddy Draper in 2004
First African American female (Chief Judge; Missouri Court of Appeals): Nannette Baker in 2008  
 First African-American female (Presiding Judge; Twenty-Second Judicial Circuit): Robin Ransom in 2018 
 First African-American female (Supreme Court of Missouri): Robin Ransom in 2021

Federal judges 
First African American female (U.S. District Court for the Eastern District of Missouri; Chief Justice): Carol E. Jackson (1976) in 1992 and 2002 respectively

Assistant Attorney General 

 First female: Margaret Young (1931)

Public Defender 

 First female: Terry Daley Schwartze in 1980

County Prosecutor 

 First female: Mayce Jones Maness (1929) in 1942

Missouri Bar Association 

 First female president: Doreen Dodson 
First African American female president: Dana Tippin Cutler

Firsts in local history

 Hilda Neihardt (1963): First female lawyer to practice law in central Missouri
 Mary Tiera Farrow (c. 1924): First female lawyer in Kansas City, Missouri [Jackson County, Clay County, Platte County, and Cass County]
 Leona P. Thurman (1949): First African American female lawyer in Kansas City, Missouri [Jackson County, Clay County, Platte County, and Cass County]
 Rosemary Straub Davison: First female lawyer in Monroe County, Missouri and Ralls County, Missouri
 Gloria Clark Reno: First African American female to serve as the Presiding Judge for the 21st Judicial Circuit (2018).
 Kayla Jackson-Williams: First African American (female) elected as a judge in Boone County, Missouri (2022)
 Margaret Young (1931): First female elected as a Buchanan County Magistrate Judge (1954)
 Delia C. Holt: First female lawyer in Cape Girardeau County, Missouri
 Jane Pansing Brown: First female judge in Clay County, Missouri
 Lisa Henderson: First female judge in Dallas County, Missouri (2010)
 Virginia Booth Anding: Reputed to be the first female lawyer in Franklin County, Missouri
 Alma Smith Dodson: First woman admitted to the Bar of Greene County, Missouri
 Edith Messina (1974): First female judge in Jackson County, Missouri (1984)
 Christine Hutson: First female to serve as an Associate Circuit Judge for Laclede County, Missouri
 Hazel Palmer: First female lawyer in Pettis County, Missouri. She would later become a judge.
 Mayce Jones Maness (1929): First female to serve as a County Prosecutor in Ripley County, Missouri (1942)
 Phoebe Couzins: First female law graduate from the University of Washington School of Law in St. Louis, Missouri (1871)
 Dorothy L. Freeman (1942): First African American female lawyer in St. Louis, Missouri
 Mabel Wood Hinckley: First female judge in St. Louis, Missouri
 Esther M. Golly (1931): First female admitted to the Bar of the Circuit Court of St. Louis County. She was also the first female President of the St. Louis County Bar Association.
 Gerre Strehlman Langton: First female to serve as the Assistant Prosecuting Attorney for St. Louis County, Missouri (1960)
 Susan Block (1975): First female elected judge in St. Louis, St. Louis County, Missouri
 Sandra Hemphill (1992): First African American female judge
 Christina Kime: First female judge in Wayne County, Missouri (2018)

See also  

 List of first women lawyers and judges in the United States
 Timeline of women lawyers in the United States
 Women in law

Other topics of interest 

 List of first minority male lawyers and judges in the United States
 List of first minority male lawyers and judges in Missouri

References 

Lawyers, Missouri, first
Missouri, first
Women, Missouri, first
Women, Missouri, first
Women in Missouri
Missouri lawyers
Lists of people from Missouri